Oberharmersbach is a town in the district of Ortenau in Baden-Württemberg in Germany

References

External links
 

Towns in Baden-Württemberg
Ortenaukreis